The Carl E. Nelson House is a historic residence in Salem, Oregon, which was built in 1924.

It was designed by Jamieson Parker.  It is a one-and-a-half-story house with main ground plan .

The house was listed on the National Register of Historic Places in 1997.

See also
National Register of Historic Places listings in Marion County, Oregon

References

Houses completed in 1924
Houses on the National Register of Historic Places in Salem, Oregon
1924 establishments in Oregon